Stewart Dudley Dagge Reburn (August 10, 1912 – June 6, 1976) was a Canadian figure skater who competed in singles and pair skating.

He was the junior Canadian champion in singles in 1928, the same year he came third in the senior pairs championship with Veronica Clarke, and as a singles skater, won the silver medal at the Canadian Figure Skating Championships in 1929 and 1931. The following year he was runner-up in the senior singles to Bud Wilson, who won the first of his all-time record-setting nine Canadian titles in the event.

He was second to Wilson again in 1931, which led to his selection for the 1932 Winter Olympics, although he withdrew prior to competition, while Wilson took home the bronze medal.

Reburn, who had also taken the bronze medal in the pairs event with Cecil Smith at the 1931 national championships, was absent from the national scene for two years, then returned in 1934 with a new partner, Louise Bertram. They pair won the gold medal at the 1935 Canadian Championships, placed fourth in the world figure-skating championships and competed in the 1936 Winter Olympics, finishing sixth. They were the first pair team to ever really skate to the music instead of using it as mere background sound. Their new and charming style captured audiences in both the figure skating and entertainment worlds. In 2015, Reburn and Bertram were inducted into the Skate Canada Hall of Fame.

Following his competitive career, Reburn skated professionally as Sonja Henie's partner in her international touring ice show. He appeared with Henie in the 1939 film Second Fiddle.

Reburn enlisted in the Royal Canadian Air Force at the outbreak of World War II, becoming a fighter pilot with final rank attained of Flight Lieutenant. He was wounded by shrapnel in December 1943, which ended both his skating and promising acting career, although after the war he worked behind the scenes in the film industry for several years, prior to taking up real estate management. He died in 1976 at the age of 63 of cancer, and was buried in Mount Pleasant Cemetery in Toronto.

Competitive highlights

Men's Singles

 J = Junior level

Pairs career
(with Bertram)

(with Cecil Smith)

(with Veronica Clarke)

References

External links

 

1912 births
1976 deaths
Canadian male single skaters
Canadian male pair skaters
Figure skaters at the 1936 Winter Olympics
Olympic figure skaters of Canada
Figure skaters from Toronto
Royal Canadian Air Force officers
Royal Canadian Air Force personnel of World War II
Canadian World War II pilots
Deaths from cancer in Ontario
20th-century Canadian people